The Jawaharlal Nehru Centre for Advanced Scientific Research (JNCASR) is a multidisciplinary research institute located at Jakkur, Bangalore, India. It was established by the Department of Science and Technology of the Government of India, to mark the birth centenary of Pandit Jawaharlal Nehru, the first prime minister of independent India. It is considered one of the most prestigious research institutes in India. In 2019, JNCASR was ranked #7 among the world's top ten research institutes by Nature journal in a normalised ranking of small research institutes with high quality output.

Academics
Researchers at the centre are divided into seven units: Chemistry and Physics of Materials, Engineering Mechanics, Evolutionary and Organismal Biology, Molecular biology and Genetics, New Chemistry, Theoretical Sciences, Education Technology and Geodynamics. There are two off-campus units: Chemical Biology and Condensed Matter Theory. JNCASR has a faculty-to-student ratio of about 1:4 and state-of-the-art experimental, computational and infrastructural facilities. It offers Ph.D. programmes, as well as an Integrated Ph.D. (post-bachelor's degree) programme in Materials Science. The small size of the institute (currently about 53 faculty members and ~300 students)  fosters interdisciplinary collaborations. It is a "deemed university", i.e., it awards its own degrees. Apart from training its own students through a wide spectrum of courses, the centre's Summer Research Fellowship programme hosts some of the brightest undergraduates in the country; the Educational Technology Unit produces teaching aids and educational material, the centre   organises and teaches short-term courses at universities across India, and trains promising young chemists and biologists as part of the programmes of Project-Oriented-Chemical-Education (POCE) and Project-Oriented-Biological-Education (POBE).

Notable faculty
 C. N. R. Rao, FRS, Bharat Ratna, Founder & Honorary President and Professor at New Chemistry Unit
 Roddam Narasimha, Padma Vibhushan, Professor at Engineering Mechanics Unit
 Khadg Singh Valdiya, Padma Bhushan, Professor at Geodynamics Unit
 M. R. S. Rao, Padma Shri, Former President (2003-2013) and DST-Year of Science Professor at Molecular Biology and Genetics Unit
 V. Nagaraja, Recipient of Shanti Swarup Bhatnagar Prize for Science and Technology, Former President, Jawaharlal Nehru Centre for Advanced Scientific Research (JNCASR), Bangalore
 Umesh Waghmare,   Physicist Infosys Prize Laureate,  Shanti Swarup Bhatnagar Award
 Maneesha S. Inamdar,  Professor at the Molecular Biology and Genetics Unit and Director at DBT-Institute for Stem Cell Science and Regenerative Medicine (inStem), Bangalore
 G. U. Kulkarni, received the B. M. Birla Science Prize. President, Jawaharlal Nehru Centre for Advanced Scientific Research (JNCASR), Bangalore
 T Govindaraju, Recipient of Shanti Swarup Bhatnagar Prize for chemical sciences and Professor at New Chemistry Unit
 Rama Govindarajan  one of the recipient of Shanti Swarup Bhatnagar Award
 Swapan Kumar Pati, recipient of Shanti Swarup Bhatnagar Award
 Amitabh Joshi, evolutionary biologist, geneticist . Recipient of Shanti Swarup Bhatnagar Prize for Science and Technology, 2006 
 Tapas Kumar Kundu, recipient of Shanti Swarup Bhatnagar Prize for Science and Technology, Professor at Molecular Biology and Genetics Unit, and Former Director, CSIR-Central Drug Research Institute, Lucknow
 Srikanth Sastry, recipient of Shanti Swarup Bhatnagar Prize for Science and Technology,  Professor of Physics
 Kaustuv Sanyal, molecular biologist, mycologist and Professor at the Molecular Biology and Genetics Unit,
 Balasubramanian Sundaram recipient the Shanti Swarup Bhatnagar Award
 Chandrabhas Narayana, Professor at Chemistry and Physics of Materials Unit, and Director, Rajiv Gandhi Centre for Biotechnology,  Thiruvananthapuram
 Tapas Kumar Maji, recipient the Shanti Swarup Bhatnagar Award

References

External links

 JNCASR website

Jawaharlal Nehru Centre for Advanced Scientific Research
Multidisciplinary research institutes
Science education in India
Monuments and memorials to Jawaharlal Nehru
Deemed universities in Karnataka
1989 establishments in Karnataka
Educational institutions established in 1989
BSL3 laboratories in India